Tricholauxania is a genus of small flies of the family Lauxaniidae.

Species
T. praeusta (Fallén, 1820)
T. claripennis Remm, 1991

References

Lauxaniidae
Brachycera genera
Taxa named by Friedrich Georg Hendel